Colin Ferrell (born November 11, 1984)  is a former American football defensive tackle for the Indianapolis Colts of the National Football League. He was originally signed by the Indianapolis Colts as an undrafted free agent in 2008. He played college football at Kent State.

Ferrell grew up in Hamilton Township, Mercer County, New Jersey, played high school football at Steinert High School, played a post-graduate year at the Peddie School in Hightstown, New Jersey, and played collegiate football at Kent State University.

References

External links
 Colts profile

1984 births
Living people
American football defensive ends
American football defensive tackles
Indianapolis Colts players
Kent State Golden Flashes football coaches
Kent State Golden Flashes football players
High school football coaches in New Jersey
Peddie School alumni
Steinert High School alumni
People from Hamilton Township, Mercer County, New Jersey
Sportspeople from Mercer County, New Jersey
Players of American football from New Jersey